Barbasphecia hephaistos is a moth of the family Sesiidae. It is known from Ghana.

The larvae feed on Loranthus species.

References

Endemic fauna of Ghana
Sesiidae
Insects of West Africa
Moths of Africa
Moths described in 2011